Greenwood Roadway was an auto and motorcycle paved racetrack located in Otter Township, Warren County,  south of Des Moines, Iowa, on Highway 65. It was only open from 1963 to 1966, but it managed to host several major auto racing events, including several Sports Car Club of America races and one round of the United States Road Racing Championship, the predecessor to the Can-Am series. Other major events included AMA National Championship motorcycle races and a round of the United States Auto Club stock car series.

When it was built, the roadway was to be one of the premier road racing tracks in the United States. However, poor spectator access and a lack of sufficient seating hindered the track's attendance. Plagued by pavement problems and little revenue, the operators of the track were forced to close it down.

External links 
Greenwood Roadway
Info
Map location

Motorsport venues in Iowa
Defunct motorsport venues in the United States
Sports in Des Moines, Iowa
Buildings and structures in Warren County, Iowa
Defunct sports venues in Iowa